Fišer (Czech feminine Fišerová) is a Czech-language transliteration of German surname Fischer. Notable people include:

 Ivana Fišer, Croatian conductor
 Luboš Fišer, Czech composer
 Lud Fiser, American athlete and coach
 Nelly Fišerová, Czech chess master
 Tereza Fišerová, Czech canoeist
 Václav Fišer, Czech athlete

 Egon Bondy - Czech author born Zbyněk Fišer

See also 
 Fischer (surname)
 Fisher (surname)

Czech-language surnames
Surnames of German origin